SS George Wythe was a Liberty ship built in the United States during World War II. She was named after Founding Father George Wythe, the first American law professor, a noted classics scholar, and a Virginia judge. The first of the seven Virginia signatories of the United States Declaration of Independence, Wythe served as one of Virginia's representatives to the Second Continental Congress and the Philadelphia Convention. Wythe taught and was a mentor to Thomas Jefferson, John Marshall, Henry Clay and other men who became American leaders.

Construction
George Wythe was laid down on 22 September 1941, under a Maritime Commission (MARCOM) contract, MCE hull 24, by the Bethlehem-Fairfield Shipyard, Baltimore, Maryland; sponsored by Miss Geanne A. Culleton, the daughter of C.J. Culleton, the resident plant auditor at the Bethlehem-Fairfield Shipyard, and was launched on 28 March 1942.

History
George Wythe was allocated to Agwilines Inc., on 9 May 1942. On 8 January 1948, she was laid up in the Hudson River Reserve Fleet, Jones Point, New York. On 21 April 1952, she was laid up in the James River Reserve Fleet, Lee Hall, Virginia. On 7 August 1953, George Wythe was withdrawn from the fleet to be loaded with grain under the "Grain Program 1953", she returned loaded on 22 August 1953. On 13 February 1956, she was withdrawn to be unload, she returned empty 29 February 1956. On 7 November 1958, George Wythe was withdrawn from the fleet to be loaded with grain under the "Grain Program 1958", she returned loaded on 21 November 1958. On 7 March 1959, she was withdrawn to be unload, she returned empty 19 March 1959. She was sold for scrapping on 24 July 1970, to Hierros Ardes, SA, for $102,666. George Wythe was removed from the fleet, 31 August 1970.

References

Bibliography

 
 
 
 

 

Liberty ships
1942 ships
Ships built in Baltimore
Hudson River Reserve Fleet
James River Reserve Fleet
James River Reserve Fleet Grain Program
Ships named for Founding Fathers of the United States